Sameh Abdel Waress Muhammad (born 3 August 1971) is an Egyptian handball player. He competed in the 1996 Summer Olympics.

References

1971 births
Living people
Handball players at the 1996 Summer Olympics
Egyptian male handball players
Olympic handball players of Egypt